Shark 3D is an engine developed by Spinor for creating and viewing interactive 3D scenes. It is mainly used for developing video games (similar to a game engine), producing films and TV series, creating broadcast graphics and developing 3D applications.

Workflow
Animations are created by playing a scene as in video games within a virtual map. 

An animator can record different characters and objects in different tracks to make their scene. For example, the animator can first play as one virtual actor and then play as another, while replaying the first one. A character or vehicle controlled live can physically interact with previously recorded characters and objects via the physics engine.

Features
Shark 3D contains:
 A tool pipeline: assets such as meshes, textures and basic animations are not created within Shark 3D, but imported from separate tools like 3ds Max or Maya.
 Authoring editor
 Physics based recording, replay and track editing
 Shader editor
 Renderer (live and render-to-file)
 Sound system
 Physics engine 
 Scripting

The core of Shark 3D is an authoring editor supporting templates and prefabs to reuse entities. Templates and prefabs can be nested to any level and edited live. This allows for building up complex scenes or objects with integrated behaviors (e.g. NPCs or complex camera systems based on simple building blocks in a flexible way).

Reception

Usage

Companies Funcom, Ravensburger Digital, Marc Weigert, Siemens, and ARD/ZDF/Pro 7/Disney Junior have or are currently using the program. In 2012, it was the second most used real-time 3D engine in Europe after Unity.

Awards
Awards given to products made with Shark 3D:

 Norwegian video game studio Funcom's PC and Xbox adventure video game Dreamfall: The Longest Journey was GameSpy's "Editor's choice" of the year 2006
 Media award "Der weiße Elefant" for the "innovative production" using Shark 3D of "D.I.E. – Detektive im Einsatz" running on Super RTL
 Lara-Award for the game Windchaser

Third-party plugins
 Camera tracking
 Cinector Motion capture
 RTF Massively multiplayer library

See also
 Autodesk Maya
 Gamebryo
 iClone
 Motionbuilder
 Moviestorm
 Muvizu
 Renderware
 Xtranormal

References

External links

IGN article about the Shark 3D based game Dreamfall

Video game engines
3D graphics software
3D animation software